Chelluboyina Srinivasa Venugopalakrishna (born 23 December 1962) is an Indian politician and businessman from the state of Andhra Pradesh. He is the Minister of Backward Classes Welfare, Public Relations, Information and Cinematography and is elected as the Member of the Legislative Assembly (MLA) representing Ramachandrapuram Assembly constituency on behalf of YSR Congress Party. He started his political career in 2000 with Indian National Congress and was elected as a member of Zilla Parishad in 2001 and 2006.

Early life 
Chelluboyina was born on 23 December 1962 to Chelluboyina Venkanna and Subhadramma in Adavi Palem, Razole mandal in erstwhile East Godavari district (now in Konaseema district), Andhra Pradesh. He graduated in Bachelor of Arts from B. R. Ambedkar Open University.

Career 
Chelluboyina is a businessman by profession. He entered politics in 2000 and joined Indian National Congress. He was appointed president of East Godavari district's Congress unit in 2008 and again 2012. He worked as a member of Pradesh Congress Committee in united Andhra Pradesh. He also worked as a member of Andhra Pradesh Pollution Control Board.

He joined YSR Congress Party (YSRCP) and contested the 2014 Andhra Pradesh Legislative Assembly election representing Kakinada Rural Assembly constituency unsuccessfully. He later contested the 2019 Andhra Pradesh Legislative Assembly election from Ramachandrapuram constituency and won as the MLA. In July 2020, he was inducted into the ministry Y. S. Jagan Mohan Reddy-led YSRCP government and was allotted the portfolio of Backward Classes Welfare. He was also appointed as the in-charge minister for East Godavari district. In April 2022, he was given additional ministries of Public Relations, Information and Cinematography.

Other work 
Chelluboyina acts as the president of AP Boxing Association since 1999.

Personal life 
Chelluboyina is married to Varalakshmi and has two sons.

References

External links 
 

Living people
1962 births
People from Konaseema district
21st-century Indian politicians
YSR Congress Party politicians
Indian National Congress politicians from Andhra Pradesh
Andhra Pradesh MLAs 2019–2024
State cabinet ministers of Andhra Pradesh